Elections to Cornwall County Council were held on 12 April 1973. This was on the same day as other UK county council elections. The whole council of 79 members was up for election and the council fell under the control of Independents.

Results

|}

References

Cornwall
1973
1970s in Cornwall